Sforzando are a Celtic music band from Australia, that combine elements of punk, Western European folk music and sea shanties to create "a soundscape for the ocean". They describe themselves as a "pirate orchestra" with Irish and Balkan influences in their sound. They issued two studio albums, We Sail Away (1997) and Hideous Sea Creatures (2002) and various other recordings including SF-EP and Midnight at the Lighthouse (live).

History 

Sforzando formed in 1995 in Melbourne by Quincy Hall on lead vocals, Dave O'Reilly on lead guitar, his sister, Karen O'Reilly, on bass guitar and Ross on drums. The group's name, sforzando, is used in musical notation to indicate that the following note should be played loudly (see dynamics). They chose this to match their loud, frenetic punk rock style.

In 1999 they performed at the Lighthouse Cafe, during the Port Fairy Folk Festival, which was recorded for their live album, Midnight at the Lighthouse, with the line-up of Hall, Scott Jansen, Stuart Mathieson, Dave O'Reilly, Karen O'Reilly, Raju Sharma and Paul Tierney.

By 2002's album, Hideous Sea Creatures, they were a six-piece and self-described as a "pirate orchestra who blend ferocious punk, Western European folk melodies and classic sea shanties to create a soundscape for the ocean." Sylvia Gauci of Vibewire caught their gig in August 2002 at The Tote in Collingwood; she felt they "played a wide selection of both more traditional, folk-inspired tunes along with the fast punk and vivacious violin playing. But on top of the musical fun, lead singer Quincy used some time to voice his opinion on the highly questionable state of our government and foreign affairs – a very commendable use of time talking to the audience."

By 2006 the line-up was Hall on lead vocals, Sharma on percussion, Jansen on violin, Tierney on drums, Dave O'Reilly on guitar and Garth Heron on bass guitar.

Members 

 Quincy Hall – vocals
 Garth Heron – bass guitar
 Scott Jansen – violin
 Dave O'Reilly – guitar
 Karen O'Relly – bass guitar
 Raju Sharma – percussion
 Ben Tarpey – bass guitar
 Paul Tierney – drums
 Sharon Ryan – guitar
 Wez Rowe – keyboards, accordion

Discography

Albums 

 We Sail Away (Mabuhay Records, 1997) (MBR00004)
 Midnight at the Lighthouse (πR8, 1999; live at Port Fairy Folk Festival) 
 Hideous Sea Creatures (Sound Vault, 2002)

Extended plays 

 SFZ.ep (Sforzando, 2005) (1698249)

References

External links
 

Victoria (Australia) musical groups
Folk punk groups
Australian punk rock groups